These are the late night schedules for the four United States broadcast networks that offer programming during this time period, from September 1991 to August 1992. All times are Eastern or Pacific. Affiliates will fill non-network schedule with local, syndicated, or paid programming. Affiliates also have the option to preempt or delay network programming at their discretion.

Legend

Schedule

Monday-Friday

Note: The final episode of The Tonight Show Starring Johnny Carson aired on May 22, 1992. The first episode of The Tonight Show with Jay Leno aired on May 25, 1992 
Note: CBS News Nightwatch was renamed Up To The Minute 
Note: Into The Night was renamed Studio 59

Saturday

By network

ABC

Returning series:
In Concert '91 
Nightline
Studio 59

New series:
ABC World News Now

CBS

Returning series:
CBS News Nightwatch

New series:
A Closer Score
Crimetime After Primetime
Night Games
Personals
Up To The Minute

Not returning from 1990-91:
America Tonight
CBS Late Night

NBC

Returning series:
Friday Night Videos
Late Night with David Letterman
Later With Bob Costas
Saturday Night Live
The Tonight Show Starring Johnny Carson

New series:
NBC Nightside
The Tonight Show with Jay Leno

Not returning from 1990-91:
The George Michael Sports Machine (continues to air in First-run syndication)

Fox

Returning series:
Comic Strip Live

United States late night network television schedules
1991 in American television
1992 in American television